Corinthomyia is a genus of midges in the family Cecidomyiidae. The one described species - Corinthomyia brevicornis - is found in the Holarctic region. The genus was established in 1911 by American entomologist Ephraim Porter Felt.

References

Cecidomyiidae genera

Insects described in 1911
Taxa named by Ephraim Porter Felt
Monotypic Diptera genera